Notable people named Bonifacio include:

 Bonifacio Flores Arévalo (1850–1920), Filipino dentist, sculptor and ardent patron of music and theater
 Bonifacio Asioli (1769–1832), Italian composer of classical and church music
 Bonifacio Ávila (born 1950), Colombian retired boxer
 Bonifacio Bembo (fl. between 1447 and 1477), Italian painter and miniaturist of the early Renaissance
 Bonifacio de Blas y Muñoz (1827–1880), Spanish politician, lawyer and Minister of State
 Bonifacio or Bonifaci Calvo (fl. 1253–1266), Genoese troubadour
 Bonifacio del Carril (1911–1994), Argentine writer, lawyer, diplomat, Foreign Minister in 1962, and historian
 Bonifacio Custodio, better known as Bonbon Custodio (born 1982), Filipino basketball player
 Bonifacio Ondó Edu (1922–1969), Prime Minister of Equatorial Guinea while it was still under Spanish colonial rule
 Bonifacio Ferrero (1476–1543), Italian Roman Catholic bishop and cardinal
 Bonifacio Herrera (born 1961), Mexican politician
 Andrés Bonifacio (1863–1897), Filipino revolutionary leader
 Bruno Bonifacio (born 1994), Brazilian racing driver
 Domingos Bonifácio (born 1984), Angolan basketball player
 Emilio Bonifacio (born 1985), Major League Baseball player
 Francesco Bonifacio (1912–1946), beatified Italian Catholic priest killed by Yugoslav communists
 Francesco Paolo Bonifacio (1923–1989), Italian politician and jurist, Minister of Justice and President of the Constitutional Court of Italy
 José Bonifácio de Andrada (1763–1838), Brazilian statesman, naturalist, professor and poet
 José Bonifácio the Younger (1827–1886), French-born Brazilian poet, teacher and senator, grand-nephew of the above
 Jorge Bonifacio (born 1993), Major League Baseball player in the Kansas City Royals system
 Leonardo Augusto Bonifácio (born 1983), Brazilian footballer
 Natale Bonifacio (1538–1592/1538–1592), maker of engravings and woodcuts in Rome
 Procopio Bonifacio (1873–1897), Filipino revolutionary for independence from Spain; younger brother of Andrés Bonifacio
 AC Bonifacio (born 2002), Canadian-Filipino dancer, actress, and singer

Italian-language surnames
Portuguese-language surnames
Spanish-language surnames
Italian masculine given names
Portuguese masculine given names
Spanish masculine given names